Akira Chiba (born February 10, 1959) was the president of Pokémon USA, Inc (PUI). He was the head officer of all worldwide Pokémon business outside of Asia.  Chiba joined PUI in 2002 to build momentum for one of the world's most popular entertainment properties, which includes video games, trading card games, an animated TV series, movies, toys, apparel and other licensed products. PUI manages Pokémon intellectual property rights, licensing, publishing of the trading card games, brand marketing and an e-commerce business.

Chiba has spent a good portion of his career establishing the U.S. subsidiaries of various Japanese companies including Recruit Co., Ltd., Tokyo and Sumitomo Real Estate Sales Co., Ltd. of Japan.

On December 23, 2005, Chiba, along with management, decided that 4Kids Entertainment would not be responsible of the Pokémon anime. Under the agreement terms, 4Kids will receive commissions for the next several years on payments made under existing Pokémon license agreements. These commissions were expected to be paid out over the course of the next several years.

Prior to joining Pokémon, Chiba founded New York Living Magazine, a residential real estate publication. A graduate of Kobe University, Chiba has a degree in business administration. He currently resides in New York City.

In December 2007, Chiba stepped down from the position of Pokémon USA, Inc to begin Museyon, Inc, a travel guidebook publication geared towards different passions.  Kenji Okubo, EVP and head of Pokémon USA's Seattle office, stepped into the vacated post.

Awards and honors

References

1959 births
Living people
Japanese business executives
Kobe University alumni